The Welsh Shadow Cabinet is constituted by members of the largest party not part of the Welsh Government. Since 6 April 2017 this has been the Welsh Conservatives, and since 7 May 2021 the Leader of the Opposition has been Andrew RT Davies.

Both the Welsh Conservatives and Plaid Cymru currently refer to their own front benches as Shadow Cabinets. As of May 2021 the following speak for their respective party and question the relevant minister in plenary session.

Conservative Shadow Cabinet

Plaid Cymru Shadow Cabinet
After winning the 2018 Plaid Cymru leadership election with 49.7% of first preference votes, Adam Price installed former leadership rivals Leanne Wood (22.3%) and Rhun ap Iorwerth (28%) in high ranking positions in his shadow cabinet. He most recently updated his cabinet in a January 2022 reshuffle

2016 Plaid-Conservative Shadow Cabinets 
At the 2016 election, Plaid Cymru, led by Leanne Wood, won 12 seats to the Welsh Conservatives' 11, and thus became the largest party not in government. On 14 October 2016 Dafydd Elis-Thomas left Plaid Cymru to sit as an independent, so that Plaid Cymru and the Welsh Conservatives both held 11 seats. During this period, Wood was not referred to as Leader of the Opposition, but merely as leader of Plaid Cymru. The Conservative group grew to 12 when Mark Reckless defected from UKIP to the Conservative group on 6 April 2017, and the Welsh Conservative leader, Andrew RT Davies at the time, was referred to as Leader of the Opposition once more.

See also
Drakeford government

References

Politics of Wales
Welsh Government
British shadow cabinets
Wales